Court Justice: Sydney is an Australian factual television show that looks at the work of twelve magistrates who preside at the Downing Centre, a major courthouse complex in Sydney, New South Wales, Australia. This observational documentary series began on the Crime and Investigation Network on 2 July 2017. It is narrated by Chris Bourke.

Overview
This series takes a look inside one of the world's busiest local courts. The twelve magistrates that preside at Sydney’s Downing Centre handle over 30,000 cases every year, from minor traffic offences to major assaults. The defendants can range from habitual offenders to everyday citizens that have made bad mistakes.

Court Justice is an observational documentary series made in Australia and is broadcast on Foxtel's Crime + Investigation Network. The series films real people and real cases taking place in The Downing Centre in Sydney. The twelve magistrates that preside at Sydney's Downing Centre handle over 30,000 cases every year; everything from minor traffic offences to major assaults. Court Justice Premiered on 2 July 2017 at 7.30 AEST.

The series has been filmed over a six-week period in late 2016 an each episode gives a look into 2 or 3 cases. The cases covered range from drunk driving offences to assault, theft and vandalism 

Small fixed-rig cameras are set up in several courtrooms to capture all that happens, this is accompanied by commentary of the magistrates on the situations.

Episodes 

Season 1
 Open For Business
 The Demon Drink
 All Walks of Life
 The Last Resort
 Importance of Parenting
 Drugs
 Regular Customers
 Drink Driving
 Self-Represented
 Judgement

References

External links
 
Official web site https://www.citv.com.au/shows/court-justice-sydney/
Downing Centre http://www.courts.justice.nsw.gov.au/Pages/cats/downing_centre.aspx

Australian factual television series
2010s Australian documentary television series
2017 Australian television series debuts
English-language television shows
Television shows set in Sydney
Australian legal television series